Orcularia is a genus of four species of lichens in the family Caliciaceae. It was originally circumscribed as a section of the genus Rinodina by Swedish botanist Gustaf Oskar Andersson Malme in 1902. Klaus Kalb and Mireia Giralt promoted it to generic status in 2011. Orcularia is characterized by the presence of ascospores that develop in such a way that the septum is inserted after lateral wall thickenings become distinct, and also by threadlike (filiform) conidia.

Species
Orcularia elixii  (2011)
Orcularia insperata  (2011)
Orcularia placodiomorpha  (2011)
Orcularia placodiomorphoides  (2011)

References

Caliciales
Lichen genera
Taxa described in 1902
Caliciales genera
Taxa named by Gustaf Oskar Andersson Malme